The Dance of Life is the second 1979 studio disc from R&B singer-songwriter/drummer/producer Narada Michael Walden.  Unlike his last two releases, it featured several songs Walden co-wrote with other people (such as Allee Willis and guitarist Corrado "Pat" Rustici).

Track listing
All songs written by Narada Michael Walden, except where noted.

"You're Soo Good" 6:02
"I Shoulda Loved Ya" (Walden, Allee Willis, T.M. Stevens) 6:34
"Lovin' You Madly" (Walden, Corrado Rustici) 5:15
"Crazy For Ya" (Willis, Walden) 3:51
"Tonight I'm Alright" 5:14
"Why Did You Turn Me On" (Walden, Willis, Rustici) 4:41
"Carry On" (Walden, Frank Martin) 5:11
"The Dance of Life" 6:33

Personnel
Narada Michael Walden - vocals, drums, percussion, piano
T.M. Stevens - bass
Corrado "Pat" Rustici - acoustic and electric guitars
Frank Martin - keyboards, piano, Prophet and Moog synthesizers
The "See America Horns" (Marc Russo - alto and tenor saxophone; Danny Noe - trombone; Dave Grover - trumpet) arranged by Narada Michael Walden on tracks 3, 4 & 7; horns arranged by Narada Michael Walden and The "See America Horns" on tracks 1 & 6; horns arranged by Narada Michael Walden, Frank Martin and The "See America Horns" on tracks 2 & 5

Production
Arranged by Narada Michael Walden
Produced by Narada Michael Walden and Bob Clearmountain
Recording and mix engineers: Bob Clearmountain; assisted by Jeff Norman and Ray Willard
Mastered by Dennis King

External links
The Dance of Life at Discogs

1979 albums
Atlantic Records albums
Albums produced by Narada Michael Walden
Albums produced by Bob Clearmountain
Narada Michael Walden albums